Polyvinylpyrrolidone (PVP), also commonly called polyvidone or povidone, is a water-soluble polymer made from the monomer N-vinylpyrrolidone. PVP is available in a range of molecular weights and related viscosities, and can be selected according to the desired application properties.

Uses

Medical

It is used as a binder in many pharmaceutical tablets; it simply passes through the body when taken orally.

PVP added to iodine forms a complex called povidone-iodine that possesses disinfectant properties. This complex is used in various products like solutions, ointment, pessaries, liquid soaps and surgical scrubs. It is known under the trade names Pyodine and Betadine, among others.

It is used in pleurodesis (fusion of the pleura because of incessant pleural effusions). For this purpose, povidone iodine is equally effective and safe as talc, and may be preferred because of easy availability and low cost.

PVP is used in some contact lenses and their packaging solutions. It reduces friction, thus acting as a lubricant, or wetting agent, built into the lens. Examples of this use include Bausch & Lomb's Ultra contact lenses with MoistureSeal Technology and Air Optix contact lens packaging solution (as an ingredient called "copolymer 845").

PVP is used as a lubricant in some eye drops, e.g. Bausch & Lomb's Soothe.

PVP was used as a plasma volume expander for trauma victims after the 1950s. It is not preferred as volume expander due to its ability to provoke histamine release and also interfere with blood grouping.

Autopsies have found that crospovidone (PVPP) contributes to pulmonary vascular injury in substance abusers who have injected pharmaceutical tablets intended for oral consumption. The long-term effects of crospovidone or povidone within the lung are unknown.

Technical
PVP is also used in many technical applications:
as a special additive for batteries, ceramics, fiberglass, inks, and inkjet paper, and in the chemical-mechanical planarization process
as an emulsifier and disintegrant for solution polymerization
to increase resolution in photoresists for cathode ray tubes (CRT)
in aqueous metal quenching
for production of membranes, such as dialysis and water purification filters
as a binder and complexation agent in agricultural applications such as crop protection, seed treatment and coating
as a thickening agent in tooth whitening gels
as an aid for increasing the solubility of drugs in liquid and semi-liquid dosage forms (syrups, soft gelatine capsules) and as an inhibitor of recrystallisation
as an additive to Doro's RNA extraction buffer 
as a liquid-phase dispersion enhancing agent in DOSY NMR
as a surfactant, reducing agent, shape controlling agent and dispersant in nanoparticle synthesis and their self-assembly
as a stabilizing agent in all inorganic solar cells

Other uses
PVP binds to polar molecules exceptionally well, owing to its polarity. This has led to its application in coatings for photo-quality ink-jet papers and transparencies, as well as in inks for inkjet printers.

PVP is also used in personal care products, such as shampoos and toothpastes, in paints, and adhesives that must be moistened, such as old-style postage stamps and envelopes. It has also been used in contact lens solutions and in steel-quenching solutions. PVP is the basis of the early formulas for hair sprays and hair gels, and still continues to be a component of some.

As a food additive, PVP is a stabilizer and has E number E1201. PVPP (crospovidone) is E1202. It is also used in the wine industry as a fining agent for white wine and some beers.

In in-vitro fertilisation laboratories, polyvinylpyrrolidone is used to slow down spermatozoa in order to capture them for e.g. ICSI.

In molecular biology, PVP can be used as a blocking agent during Southern blot analysis as a component of Denhardt's buffer. It is also exceptionally good at absorbing polyphenols during DNA purification. Polyphenols are common in many plant tissues and can deactivate proteins if not removed and therefore inhibit many downstream reactions like PCR.

In microscopy, PVP is useful for making an aqueous mounting medium.

PVP can be used to screen for phenolic properties, as referenced in a 2000 study on the effect of plant extracts on insulin production.

Safety
The U.S. Food and Drug Administration (FDA) has approved this chemical for many uses, and it is generally recognized as safe (GRAS). PVP is including in the Inactive Ingredient Database for use in oral, topical, and injectable formulations.

However, there have been documented cases of allergic reactions to PVP/povidone, particularly regarding subcutaneous (applied under the skin) use and situations where the PVP has come in contact with autologous serum (internal blood fluids) and mucous membranes.

Examples of documented allergic reactions:
 A boy had an anaphylactic response after application of PVP-Iodine for treatment of impetigo. He was found to be allergic to the PVP component of the solution.
 A woman had experienced urticaria (hives) from various hair products, later found to contain PVP. The woman had an anaphylactic response after povidone-iodine solution was applied internally during a surgery. She was found to be allergic to PVP.
 A man experiencing anaphylaxis after taking acetaminophen tablets orally was found to be allergic to PVP.

Additionally, Povidone is commonly used in conjunction with other chemicals. Some of these, such as iodine, are blamed for allergic responses. Yet subsequent testing results in some patients show no signs of allergy to the suspect chemical. Allergies attributed to these other chemicals may possibly be caused by the PVP instead.

There are high-purity injectable grades of PVP available on the market, for specific use in intravenous, intramuscular, and subcutaneous applications.

Properties
PVP is soluble in water and other polar solvents. For example, it is soluble in various alcohols, such as methanol and ethanol, as well as in more exotic solvents like the deep eutectic solvent formed by choline chloride and urea (Relin). When dry it is a light flaky hygroscopic powder, readily absorbing up to 40% of its weight in atmospheric water. In solution, it has excellent wetting properties and readily forms films. This makes it good as a coating or an additive to coatings.

A 2014 study found fluorescent properties of PVP and its oxidized hydrolyzate.

History
PVP was first synthesized by BASF chemist, Walter Reppe, and a patent was filed in 1939 for one of the derivatives of acetylene chemistry. PVP was initially used as a blood plasma substitute and later in a wide variety of applications in medicine, pharmacy, cosmetics and industrial production. BASF continues to make PVP, including a pharmaceutical portfolio under the brand name of Kollidon.

Cross-linked derivatives

See also
2-Pyrrolidone
Peter DeMarco

References

Vinyl polymers
Food additives
Pyrrolidones
Excipients
E-number additives